The 1963 Australian Drivers' Championship was a CAMS sanctioned national motor racing title for drivers of Formula Libre cars with the championship winner awarded the 1963 CAMS Gold Star. The title was contested over a six-round series:
 Round 1, Australian Grand Prix, Warwick Farm, New South Wales, 10 February
 Round 2, Lakeside International, Lakeside, Queensland, 17 February
 Round 3, South Pacific Gold Star Championship, Longford, Tasmania, 4 March
 Round 4, Victorian Road Racing Championship, Sandown, Victoria, 15 September
 Round 5, Gold Star Championship Race, Mallala, South Australia, 14 October
 Round 6, Horden Trophy, Warwick Farm, New South Wales, 1 December
Championship points were awarded on a 12-7-5-3-2-1 basis at each round to the top six Australians licence holders.
Race placings gained by drivers who were not Australian licence holders were disregarded by CAMS when determining placings for points allocation. Each driver could retain points only from the Australian Grand Prix plus his/her best four performances from the other five rounds.

Results 

Note:

 Round 1: Of the 11 finishers, 2nd placed John Surtees, 3rd placed Bruce McLaren, 6th placed Graham Hill & 7th placed Tony Shelley were not eligible to score points
 Round 2: Of the 7 known finishers, 1st placed John Surtees, 2nd placed Graham Hill, 4th placed Chris Amon & 6th placed Jim Palmer were not eligible to score points.
 Round 3: Of the 8 known finishers, 1st placed Bruce McLaren, 4th placed Jim Palmer, 6th placed Tony Maggs & 4th placed Chris Amon were not eligible to score points.
 Round 4: The 5th placed driver is not known, hence the 2 points awarded for this placing are not shown in the above table.

References 

 Australian Motor Manual, February 1964
 Australian Motor Sports, March 1963
 Modern Motor, December 1963
 Modern Motor, February 1964
 Modern Motor, November 1963
 Official Souvenir Programme, Mallala Motor Races, Monday, 14 October 1963
 Racing Car News, August 1972 (Gold Star Supplement)
 Racing Car News, January 1964
 Sports Car World, April 1963
 The Age, Monday, 15 September 1963
 The Mercury, Tuesday, 5 March 1963
 The official 50 race history of the Australian Grand Prix, 1986
 www.camsmanual.com.au

Australian Drivers' Championship
Drivers' Championship